Cleaning Up is a 1933 British comedy film directed by Leslie S. Hiscott and starring George K. Gee, Betty Astell and Davy Burnaby. It was made at Beaconsfield Studios as a quota quickie.

The film's sets were designed by Norman G. Arnold.

Cast
 George K. Gee as Tony Pumpford  
 Betty Astell as Marian Brent  
 Davy Burnaby as Lord Pumpford  
 Barbara Gott as Lady Rudd  
 Alfred Wellesley as Sir Rickaby Rudd  
 Muriel George as Mrs. Hoggenheim  
 Joan Matheson as Angela  
 Dorothy Vernon as Agatha 
 The Max Rivers Girls as The Chorus Girls  
 Rona Ricardo

References

Bibliography
 Low, Rachael. Filmmaking in 1930s Britain. George Allen & Unwin, 1985.
 Wood, Linda. British Films, 1927-1939. British Film Institute, 1986.

External links

1933 films
British comedy films
1933 comedy films
1930s English-language films
Films shot at Beaconsfield Studios
Films directed by Leslie S. Hiscott
Quota quickies
Films set in England
British black-and-white films
1930s British films